George Berovich (Georgios Verovits, 1845–1897), known as Berovich Pasha was a Christian Ottoman statesman who served as Governor-General (wāli) of Crete and Prince of Samos.

Biography
Berovich was born in Scutari, Sanjak of Scutari, Ottoman Empire (modern Albania). He was of Serb ethnic origin. He was the last of a line of Ottoman pashas of the Berovich family. In 19th-century Ottoman Empire, the government asked Christian families to send sons to be educated in Istanbul in order to provide Christian administrators for Christian-majority provinces.

He was appointed to several administrative positions in Turkey. Before coming to Samos, he was a counselor in the vilayet administration of Crete. He came to Samos in the midst of an armed rebellion by the Greek population of the island. Turkish army was poised to send punitive expedition but his intervention provided the mutually accepted compromise. To Greeks he was an independent Prince and the Sultan regarded him as his Pasha.

He settled the economy of the island and he was generally successful in his administration and popular with the Samians. Among other measures, he tried unsuccessfully to institute the permanence of civil servants, but reinforced the freedom of the press, promoted agriculture, and in 1895 he set up the Archaeological Museum of Samos.

He said in a speech before the Samian Parliament : "The Parliament and I have common boundaries. You shouldn't trespass my boundaries and I shouldn't trespass yours. So, we will be friends for ever". 

He was reassigned to a new post by the Porte while he was on a tour at the Marathokampos region. His departure was generally viewed unfavorably by the Samian population.

A similar rebellion by the Greek population of Crete took place in 1897 and Pasha Berovich was sent by the Porte as Governor General, expected to achieve a similar compromise as on Samos. Unfortunately the fighting on Crete had already taken deep root and although Greeks regarded him favorably the Turkish population and army refused to obey. The Sultan tried to intervene in his favor by the award of the Order of Osmaniye but to no avail. He was even arrested by the Turkish army commander. The Great Powers who had laid a blockade of the island intervened to set him free. He was subsequently provided with a detachment of the Montenegrin Army as bodyguards. Their arrival in Chania was greeted with jubilation by the Greek population. After the establishment of the independent Cretan State, Pasha Berovich handed over the keys of the fort of Chania to Prince George of Greece and retired to Venice.

References

  

1845 births
19th-century people from the Ottoman Empire
People from the Ottoman Empire of Serbian descent
Christians from the Ottoman Empire
Civil servants from the Ottoman Empire
Pashas
Princes of Samos
Ottoman governors of Crete
Year of death missing
People from Shkodër
19th-century rulers in Europe
Serbs in Albania